Mihajlo Arsoski (born September 21, 1995) is a Macedonian professional basketball Power forward who plays for KK Kožuv in the Macedonian First League. He is also a member of the North Macedonia national basketball team.

Arsoski began the 2021–22 season with KK Feniks 2010 Skopje and averaged 2.2 points and 1.2 rebounds per game. On February 28, 2022, he signed with KK Kožuv.

References

External links
 
 

1995 births
Living people
KK MZT Skopje players
Macedonian men's basketball players
Sportspeople from Skopje
Centers (basketball)